Juan de Dios Ramírez Heredia (born 29 July 1942) is a Spanish politician, of Romani ethnic origin. He is a member of the Spanish Socialist Workers' Party. In 1986-1999 he was a Member of the European Parliament. He was born in Puerto Real, Cádiz.

Background 
By profession he is a lawyer and is a graduate in Information Science from the Autonomous University of Barcelona, a Doctor in Information Sciences and Master of General Basic Education (EGB). He was Director of the School of Vocational Rehabilitation, "San Juan Bosco" for the physically handicapped in Barcelona between 1970 and 1990.

Political career 
A member of the Spanish Romani community, he has been involved in highlighting and defending the rights of Romani people.  In recognition of this work, in February 2008 he was awarded an Honorary Doctorate by the University of Cádiz, the first Rom to receive this distinction in the world. Ramírez Heredia also promotes Romanò-Kalò, a variant of International Romani, enriched by Caló words. His goal is to reunify the Caló and Romani roots.

References

External links
Romanò-Kalò (As promoted by Juan de Dios Ramírez Heredia)

1942 births
Autonomous University of Barcelona alumni
Living people
MEPs for Spain 1986–1987
MEPs for Spain 1987–1989
MEPs for Spain 1989–1994
Romani politicians
Spanish Romani people
Spanish Socialist Workers' Party MEPs